Graham R. Fleming is a Professor of Chemistry at the University of California, Berkeley and member of the Kavli Energy NanoScience Institute based at UCB.

Fleming's team is known for developing and using techniques in advanced multidimensional, ultrafast spectroscopy to study complex condensed phase dynamics in systems including natural photosynthetic complexes and nanoscale systems including single-walled carbon nanotubes and organic photovoltaic systems.

These investigations and the findings of Fleming's team have indicated the key role of quantum electronic coherence in disordered biological environments. These findings have pointed towards the importance of examining the role of quantum dynamical processes in biological energy harvesting systems.

Education, career, and service 
Fleming was born 3 December 1949 in Barrow (now Barrow-in-Furness), England and received his B.S. degree with honors in Chemistry from the University of Bristol in 1971. He subsequently received his Ph.D. in physical chemistry from the University College London and the Royal Institution in 1974. Fleming then held postdoctoral researcher appointments at three institutions: California Institute of Technology (1974–1975); University of Melbourne (1975–1976); and the Royal Institution (1976–1979).

In 1979, Fleming began his independent research team with a faculty appointment at the University of Chicago. He was promoted to associate professor at the University of Chicago in 1983 and in 1985 was made a full professor. In 1987, Fleming was named the Arthur Holly Compton Distinguished Services Professor a position which he held for ten years. At the University of Chicago, Fleming served for three years as the Chair of the Chemistry Department. During his time at the University of Chicago, he worked with Keith Moffatt to found the University's first new research institute in 50 years, the Institute for Biophysical Dynamics.

Fleming transitioned his research team to the University of California, Berkeley in 1997 where he held joint appointments as Professor in Chemistry and the founding Director of the Physical Biosciences Division at Lawrence Berkeley National Laboratory. In 2002, Fleming received an appointment as the Melvin Calvin Distinguished Professor of Chemistry at UCB. Fleming was also Founding director of the California Institute for Quantitative Biosciences (QB3) based at UC Berkeley.

In the areas of service to the University, Fleming also served as the vice-chancellor for research at UCB from April 2009 to 2015.

Harassment Allegations 
Fleming resigned from his position as Vice Chancellor for Research (2015) and was subsequently removed as a Berkeley Global Campus ambassador (2016) following the filing of a harassment complaint against him by a former employee in 2014. The investigation that followed determined Fleming had violated the University of California's sexual harassment policy.

Select publications
Fleming has an extensive publication record. Listed below are some select publications from his independent research career at UC Berkeley: 

These are some select publication's from Fleming's tenure at The University of Chicago:

Finally, these are some additional notable publications from before Fleming began his independent research group:

Awards and honors
Source:

Fellow, American Academy of Arts and Sciences (1991)
Fellow, Royal Society of London (1994)
Award from the Inter-American Photochemical Society (1996)
Award from the Royal Society of Chemistry (1996)
Centenary Lecture, Royal Society of Chemistry (1996)
Max T. Rogers Distinguished Lectureship, Michigan State University (1997)
Peter Debye Award in Physical Chemistry, American Chemical Society (1998)
Harrison Howe Award in Physical Chemistry, ACS (1999)
Earle K. Plyler Prize for Molecular Spectroscopy, American Physical Society (2002)
Sierra Nevada Distinguished Chemist Award (2003)
Porter Medal, European Photochemistry Association (2004)
Member, United States National Academy of Sciences (2007)
Presidential Lecture, Iowa State University (2008)
Ahmed Zewail Award in Ultrafast Science and Technology, American Chemical Society (2008)
Joel Henry Hildebrand Award in the Theoretical & Experimental Chemistry of Liquids, American Chemical Society (2009)

References

1949 births
Living people
American physical chemists
Spectroscopists
UC Berkeley College of Chemistry faculty
Fellows of the Royal Society
Members of the United States National Academy of Sciences
Foreign Fellows of the Indian National Science Academy
Alumni of University College London
Members of the American Philosophical Society